The 1983 Vuelta a España was the 38th edition of the Vuelta a España, one of cycling's Grand Tours. The Vuelta began in Almussafes, with a prologue individual time trial on 19 April, and Stage 11 occurred on 30 April with a stage from Soria. The race finished in Madrid on 8 May.

Stage 11
30 April 1983 — Soria to Logroño,

Stage 12
1 May 1983 — Logroño to Burgos,

Stage 13
2 May 1983 — Aguilar de Campoo to Lakes of Covadonga,

Stage 14
3 May 1983 — Cangas de Onís to León,

Stage 15a
4 May 1983 — León to Valladolid,

Stage 15b
4 May 1983 — Valladolid to Valladolid,  (ITT)

Stage 16
5 May 1983 — Valladolid to Salamanca,

Stage 17
6 May 1983 — Salamanca to Ávila,

Stage 18
7 May 1983 — Ávila to Palazuelos de Eresma (Destilerías DYC),

Stage 19
8 May 1983 — Palazuelos de Eresma (Destilerías DYC) – Madrid,

References

1983 Vuelta a España
Vuelta a España stages